Griffon Corporation is a multinational conglomerate headquartered in New York City. The company conducts its operations through five subsidiaries: The AMES Companies, ClosetMaid, Clopay Building Products, CornellCookson, and Telephonics Corporation. Griffon has been publicly traded since 1961 and is listed on the New York Stock Exchange as a component stock of the S&P SmallCap 600, S&P Composite 1500, and Russell 2000 indices.

Griffon operates as a diversified management and holding company conducting business through wholly owned subsidiaries. Griffon provides direction and assistance to its subsidiaries in connection with acquisition and growth opportunities as well as in connection with divestitures. Griffon focuses on acquiring, owning, and operating businesses in a variety of industries, and intends to continue the growth of its existing segments and diversify further through investments and acquisitions.

Griffon's subsidiaries include:

The AMES Companies is a manufacturer of non-powered lawn and garden tools and accessories.  

ClosetMaid is a North American manufacturer and distributor of wood and wire home storage and organization products. 

Clopay Building Products is a manufacturer of residential and commercial sectional doors, and is North America's largest manufacturer of residential garage doors.  

CornellCookson is a leader in the manufacture of commercial rolling steel doors and security grilles in North America.

History

Founding and early years (1959–1964) 
In 1959, Long Island businessman Helmuth W. Waldorf –  a tool and die maker's apprentice who had immigrated to the United States from Germany to study at Columbia University – founded a small defense electronics company in College Point, Queens that was initially named Waldorf Controls Corporation but changed its name later that year to Instrument Systems Corporation (ISC). In 1961, ISC issued shares to the public and bolstered its fledgling avionics business by acquiring Telephonics Corporation. Established in December 1933, Telephonics was among a handful of aviation electronics pioneers that formed the nucleus of the aviation and defense industry on Long Island during the mid-20th century. ISC struggled financially in its early years. To reposition the company for future growth, ISC's major stakeholders, including Waldorf and director Lester Avnet, the president of Avnet Electronics Corporation and son of its founder Charles Avnet, turned to a highly regarded former executive at Loral Corporation, Edward Garrett.

Edward J. Garrett era (1964–1982) 
Edward Garrett was named chairman and president of ISC in 1964. Following a strategy that had proved successful at Loral, Garrett transformed ISC by closing deficit-ridden plants, seeking civilian markets as well as government research-and-development contracts, and acquiring a wide array of young growth-oriented companies, mainly in defense and commercial electronics and manufacturing. In 1966, Garrett brought in his son-in-law, Harvey Blau, a former Assistant U.S. Attorney for the Southern District of New York, as General Counsel to help navigate legal issues and close transactions. ISC purchased 20 companies in 1968 alone, ranking second in acquisitions nationwide that year, as investor appetite for corporate conglomerates reached its peak. That year ISC listed its stock on the American Stock Exchange, which was then home to many fast-growing companies. ISC's subsidiaries operated plants throughout the United States and Canada producing electronic devices, special purpose trucks, hardware tools, batteries, furniture, decorative glassware, plastic packaging, calculators and data processors, and sheet-metal building products, among others. ISC's biggest contracts of the Garrett era exemplified the company's continued ability to leverage innovative technologies it had developed for military or government purposes and apply them to civilian use. For example, after successfully producing communications systems for the U.S. military, Telephonics won multi-year contracts to produce multiplex passenger entertainment systems for the new Boeing 747 and Lockheed L-1011 wide-body airplanes.

Garrett's aggressive strategy grew ISC at an astonishing rate in less than a decade: net sales increased from $5.7 million in 1964 to $165.2 million in 1970 and total assets from $4.1 million to $120.4 million in the same period. In 1970, ISC was listed for the first time on the prestigious Fortune 500 list of America's largest companies. As the 1970s progressed, however, Garrett's strategy faced stiff headwinds. Conglomerates had fallen out of favor with investors, who preferred companies to focus on a single industry, and with the Nixon Administration, which was concerned about mass layoffs after acquisitions. As the Vietnam War winded down, U.S. defense spending also started to decrease. The first and second oil crises as well as the recessions of 1973–1975 and the early 1980s further diminished ISC's prospects. As a result of these macroeconomic developments and the divestiture of underperforming divisions, ISC's revenues fell from $233.25 million in 1974 to $104.3 million in 1982 – the year Garrett died at age 64.

Harvey R. Blau era (1982–2008) 
Following Edward Garrett's death in 1982, Harvey R. Blau was named chairman of the board and CEO. Blau moved ISC from "the brink of not surviving” back on a profitable footing by accelerating Garrett's divestiture and cost-cutting plan and selling ISC's window, lighting and metal casting operations. The new leadership also improved the company's finances by raising capital via a rights offering to existing shareholders, boosting shareholder equity from $4.6 million to $33.7 million and reducing long-term debt. “What we have left is what we want and it’s profitable,” Blau told shareholders in 1983. ISC's subsidiaries also successfully secured new business. Telephonics received orders to develop components for the central integrated test system of Rockwell International's B-1B bomber, communications and radio control systems for Lockheed S-3A aircraft and Sikorsky SH-60 Seahawk LAMPS MK III helicopters, and a new advanced audio communications system for NASA's Space Shuttle orbiter spaceplane.

In addition to strengthening ISC's existing lines of business, Blau pursued a price-conscious acquisition strategy and reestablished a conglomerate structure by purchasing undervalued growth-oriented companies in unrelated industry sectors in order to diversify ISC's source of revenue and earnings. In 1984, ISC acquired troubled clothing manufacturer Oneita Knitting Mills, Inc., for $14 million. Blau and his team renamed the company Oneita Industries, restructured its finances, and grew it to the country's third-largest maker of specialty T-shirts, tripling sales to $300 million within a few years. ISC took Oneita public in 1988, selling 34 percent of shares for about $9 million, and had divested the remainder of the company by 1993.

The purchase of Clopay Corporation in 1986 for $37 million represented ISC's most successful diversification effort under Blau. Founded as a paper wholesaler in 1859, this Cincinnati-based company started to produce window coverings during World War II and subsequently changed its name to Clopay, a portmanteau of "cloth and paper." Clopay entered the plastic film and garage door business in 1952 and 1966, respectively. It was these two divisions that would become key elements of ISC's growth in the 1990s and 2000s. By building long-term relationships with key strategic business partners, ISC built Clopay into the leading manufacturer of residential garage doors in the United States and one of the suppliers of plastic films for diapers, surgical gowns, and drapes. In 1991, Clopay accounted for 70 percent of ISC's $50 million operating income.

Although Blau had transformed ISC into a streamlined holding company with three thriving core businesses – plastics, garage doors, and electronics – within a decade, Wall Street hadn't noticed. "We're very frustrated that we haven't gotten our story across," Blau stated at the time. To raise ISC's profile, Blau moved the company's stock from the American Stock Exchange to the more prestigious New York Stock Exchange in 1994 and changed its name to Griffon Corporation after the mythical half-lion, half-eagle that represented strength through diversity and was known for guarding valuable treasure.

Griffon continued to grow from the mid-1990s through the mid-2000s. Sales surpassed the $1 billion mark in 1999 and $1.5 billion mark in 2006. Clopay Plastics formed a joint venture named Finotech with German-based Corovin GmbH to manufacture specialty plastic films and laminates in Europe in 1996, taking a 60 percent stake in the new company. Finotech provided Clopay Plastics with a platform for further international expansion. Clopay purchased Bohme Verpackungsfolien GmbH & Co., a German manufacturer of plastic packaging and specialty films in 1998 and a 60 percent stake in Isofilme Ltda, a Brazilian manufacturer of plastic hygienic and specialty films, in 2002. Three years later, Clopay acquired full ownership in Finotech and Isofilme. Telephonics won its first contract for more than $100 million in 1997. It received $114 million from the British Royal Air Force to supply communications equipment to upgrade Nimrod anti-submarine airplanes. However, Telephonics reduced its overall dependence on military contracts and expanded its commercial and nondefense government business. Among others, it won a $26 million contract to supply wireless communications equipment for 1,080 New York City Subway cars in 1997. Griffon's garage door subsidiary expanded in step with the residential housing boom in the United States. It added a home installation service for residential building products such as garage doors, manufactured fireplaces, floor coverings, and cabinetry. In 1997, Griffon purchased Holmes-Hally Industries for about $35 million. Holmes-Hally was a West Coast manufacturer and installer of residential garage doors and related hardware with $80 million in annual sales. By 2006, the installation services subsidiary served 17 percent of all new residential housing in the United States.

The bursting of the U.S. housing bubble in 2007 and subsequent collapse of the subprime mortgage industry and global financial crisis affected the garage door and installation services subsidiaries severely and depressed Griffon's overall financial results. Net sales of the garage doors subsidiary declined by 13 percent in 2007 and 10.5 percent in 2008 with operating profits decreasing from $41 million in 2006 to $7 million in 2007 to -$17 million in 2008. Net sales of the installation services subsidiary shrunk from $309 million in 2006 to $251 million in 2007 to $109 million in 2008, forcing Griffon to discontinue the installation services business in 2008. Griffon's overall net income shrunk from $52 million to $22 million to -$41 million in the same time period. Griffon also came under pressure from shareholders during this crisis. In 2007, the hedge fund Clinton Group, which was Griffon's second-largest shareholder at 8.5 percent, urged the company to boost its share price by purchasing 50 percent of the shares outstanding and also demanded the right to appoint the majority of Griffon directors. In response, Blau hired Goldman Sachs to evaluate strategic alternatives for the company.

Ronald J. Kramer era (2008–present) 
As Harvey Blau approached his 25th anniversary as Griffon CEO, he concluded that it was time for new leadership to lead the company through the Great Recession and return it to a growth trajectory. Just as Blau had succeeded his father-in-law Edward Garrett in 1982, he was succeeded by his son-in-law Ron Kramer on April 1, 2008. Blau continued as non-executive chairman of the board. An investment banker who had married Blau's daughter Stephanie in 1992, Kramer had served on the company's board of directors since 1993 and was elected vice chairman in 2003.

To improve Griffon's balance sheet, Kramer secured a new $100 million revolving line of credit from JPMorgan Chase, exited the residential installation services business, which had experienced a 65-percent decline in net sales over 3 years (see above), refinanced Griffon's senior debt, and raised about $250 million from a stock offering and investments by Goldman Sachs, Kramer, and existing Griffon shareholders. Griffon's recapitalization eliminated the need to meet near-term debt obligations and built a cash cushion for future acquisitions. 

Concerned about reductions in U.S. defense spending with the wars in Iraq and Afghanistan winding down, Griffon reduced Telephonics' staff from 1,400 in 2010 to 1,100 in 2012, restructured its facilities and organizational structure, and focused on expanding its presence in the growing homeland security, air traffic management, and unmanned aerial vehicle (“drone”) markets, both domestically and internationally. In 2012, Telephonics formed a joint venture with Mahindra & Mahindra to produce radar and surveillance systems for the Indian Ministry of Defense and the civilian sector near Delhi, India. This joint venture together with civilian contracts, such as a $23 million award from the Federal Aviation Administration in 2014 to upgrade airport surveillance radar, positioned Telephonics for further growth. To diversify revenue stream in the home and building products division, Griffon purchased Ames True Temper for $542 million in 2010. Founded in 1774, Ames was a manufacturer of non-powered landscaping tools. Kramer strengthened the new subsidiary through further acquisitions, which were integrated into Ames (renamed The AMES Companies). In 2011, Griffon acquired the Southern Patio pots and planters business from Southern Sales & Marketing Group for $23 million. To complement the Southern Patio brand, Griffon purchased Northcote Pottery, an Australian maker of garden decor products founded in 1897, for $22 million in late 2013. A few months later, Griffon acquired Cyclone, the Australian garden and tools division of Illinois Tool Works, for $40 million.

Griffon added further depth to senior management to better guide strategic decision-making, assist with acquisition and growth opportunities, and allocate resources more effectively. In 2009, Griffon hired Brian Harris from Dover Corporation as chief accounting officer, promoting him to vice president and controller in 2012 and senior vice president and CFO in 2015.

In 2012, the company named Robert Mehmel President and COO. Mehmel joined Griffon from DRS Technologies, a manufacturer of defense electronic products, systems, and military support services, which grew from $400 million to over $4 billion in sales during his tenure. In 2008, DRS was acquired by Italian conglomerate Finmeccanica for $5.2 billion which, at that time, was the largest single acquisition of a U.S. defense company by a foreign firm.

Kramer was appointed chairman of the board in 2018, succeeding Harvey Blau after his death in January 2018.

Between August 2011 and March 2018, Griffon repurchased 21.9 million shares of common stock for a total of $290 million. As of March 2018, there was additional repurchase authorization remaining of $21 million.

Portfolio reorganization 
Starting in 2017, Griffon executed a series of transactions to increase shareholder value, and to reshape the company's portfolio with the objectives of better focusing and strengthening its core businesses. In October 2017, Griffon acquired the ClosetMaid home storage and organization business from Emerson (NYSE:EMR) for an effective purchase price of $165 million. ClosetMaid is expected to add $300 million of sales to Griffon's Home and Building Products segment. Griffon announced the combination of ClosetMaid with The AMES Companies in March 2018, with the expectation of unlocking additional value given the complementary customers, warehousing and distribution, manufacturing, and sourcing capabilities of the two businesses.

In November 2017, Griffon announced the sale of its Clopay Plastics business to Berry Global (NYSE:BERY) for $475 million. This transaction, which closed in February 2018, marked Griffon's exit from the specialty plastics industry that the company entered when it acquired Clopay in 1986. This divestiture provided immediate liquidity to Griffon, and is also expected to be a contributor to improving the company's future free cash flow conversion given the elevated capital needs of the Clopay Plastics operations as compared to Griffon's other subsidiaries.

Griffon bolstered its Clopay Building Products subsidiary with the acquisition of CornellCookson, a provider of rolling steel service doors, fire doors, and grilles, for an effective purchase price of $170 million. This transaction, completed in June 2018, rounds out the Clopay Building Products portfolio with a line of commercial rolling steel products to complement the existing Clopay sectional door offerings in the commercial industry. 

During this time, Griffon also closed a number of acquisitions to strengthen The AMES Companies worldwide. In the United Kingdom, Griffon acquired La Hacienda, an outdoor living brand of unique heating and garden décor products, and KelKay, a manufacturer and distributor of decorative outdoor landscaping, in April 2017 and February 2018, respectively. These two businesses provided AMES with a platform for growth in the UK market are expected to help with building channels to garden centers, retailers, and grocers in the UK and Ireland.

In Australia, Griffon started 2017 announcing it had acquired Hills Home Living, the iconic brand of clotheslines and home products, from Hills Limited (ASX:HIL). Later, in September 2017, Griffon acquired Tuscan Path, a provider of pots, planters, pavers, decorative stone, and garden décor products.

In the United States, Griffon acquired Harper Brush Works, a U.S. manufacturer of cleaning products for professional, home, and industrial use, from Horizon Global (NYSE:HZN) in October 2017 to expand the AMES line of long-handle tools to include brooms, brushes, and other cleaning products.

Operating segments and subsidiaries
Griffon today conducts its operations through five wholly owned subsidiaries in two reportable segments.

Home and Building Products Segment 
Griffon's Home and Building Products segment includes The AMES Companies, ClosetMaid, Clopay Building Products, and CornellCookson.

Clopay Building Products 
Clopay Building Products (CBP) is the largest manufacturer and marketer of residential garage doors in North America and one of the largest manufacturers of industrial and commercial doors for the new construction, and repair, and remodel markets. CBP operates through a national network of over 50 distribution centers across North America, and sells to approximately 2,000 independent professional installing dealers as well as to major home center retail chains.

CBP's self-installment customers are Home Depot and Menards. CBP's family of brands includes Clopay, America's Favorite Garage Doors, Holmes Garage Door Company, and IDEAL Door.

CBP traces its operations to the purchase of garage door maker Baker-Aldor-Jones by Clopay Corporation in 1964, and the acquisition of Holmes-Hally Industries in 1997. Today, Clopay continues to manufacture its products in the United States, with headquarters and principal manufacturing sites in Ohio.

CornellCookson 
CornellCookson is a North American manufacturer of rolling steel service doors, fire doors, counter doors and fire shutters, and security grilles. These products are designed for commercial, industrial, institutional, and retail applications. CornellCookson sells to a network of approximately 700 independent professional installing dealers as well as directly to national accounts.

CornellCookson traces its roots back to 1828, when founder George Cornell took over the blacksmith shop where he worked in Manhattan and formed Cornell Iron Works. Cornell was a major provider of cast iron products until the early 1900s, when the company began focusing exclusively on rolling steel door products. In 2008, Cornell Iron Works acquired the Cookson Door Company, another manufacturer of rolling steel door systems that was founded by the Cookson family in 1938. CornellCookson still manufactures its products in the United States, with principal manufacturing sites in Pennsylvania and Arizona.

The AMES Companies 

Acquired by Griffon for $542 million in 2010, the AMES Companies ("Ames") are a provider of non-powered lawn and garden tools and accessories, including include long handle tools, wheelbarrows, planters, snow tools, striking tools, pruning tools, garden hoses, and clotheslines. AMES is one of the oldest companies in the United States in continuous operation, founded when Captain John Ames started his blacksmith shop making America's finest metal shovels in 1774. AMES continues to be a manufacturer of hand and long-handle tools to this day. Many of the other AMES businesses and brands, including True Temper, Garant, and Union Tool, can trace their histories back directly or through predecessor companies to the 1800s..

The largest customers of AMES are Home Depot, Lowe's, Walmart, Costco, and Bunnings Warehouse. AMES tool brands include AMES, True Temper, Union Tools, Garant, Cyclone, Kelso, Razor-Back, Jackson, Trojan, Trojan Cyclone, Supercraft, and Westmix. Garden hose, storage products and apparel care products are sold primarily under the AMES, NeverLeak, Nylex, Jackson, and Hills brands. Planters, landscaping and lawn accessories brands include Southern Patio, Northcote Pottery, Kelkay and Dynamic Design.

AMES maintains manufacturing operations in the United States and in Canada, and also has principal operations in Australia and the United Kingdom. AMES is headquartered in Pennsylvania. President Donald Trump visited the AMES wheelbarrow and manufacturing plant in Harrisburg, Pennsylvania on May 7, 2017, to commemorate his 100th day in office while highlighting his emphasis on buying products that are made in America. The AMES plant in Harrisburg is the largest wheelbarrow factory in the world.

Telephonics Corporation/Defense Segment
Telephonics provides intelligence, surveillance, and communications solutions that are deployed across a wide range of land, sea, and air applications. Major product lines include radar systems for maritime surveillance, search and rescue, and weather applications; intercommunications systems for on-platform communications such as wireless intercoms; identification friend or foe (IFF) interrogators; border surveillance systems; and air traffic management (ATM) products.

The Telephonics System Engineering Group (SEG) provides technical services including threat and radar systems engineering and analytical support.

Telephonics has been a part of Griffon since 1961, but the business dates back to New York City in 1933, when the company manufactured headphones and microphones to support the United States Navy. Telephonics has a long history of technical and product innovation, including having developed the first multiplexed passenger entertainment and service system for the Boeing 747 jetliner in 1967.

In June 2022, Telephonics was sold by Griffon to TTM Technologies, a manufacturer of printed circuit boards, backplane assemblies and RF modules and asssemblies.

References

External links 
 Griffon Corporation homepage

Aerospace companies of the United States
Avionics companies
Conglomerate companies of the United States
Defense companies of the United States
Garden tool manufacturers
Plastics companies of the United States
Multinational companies headquartered in the United States
Holding companies of the United States
Holding companies based in New York City
Manufacturing companies based in New York City
American companies established in 1995
Conglomerate companies established in 1995
Holding companies established in 1995
Manufacturing companies established in 1995
Technology companies established in 1995
1995 establishments in New York City
Publicly traded companies based in New York City
Companies listed on the New York Stock Exchange
Tool manufacturing companies of the United States